Henlow Camp is a village in Bedfordshire, England.

RAF Henlow was first established in the area during World War I. Henlow Camp as a civilian settlement has grown up around the station since this time. Though Henlow Camp is part of the Henlow civil parish, it is located nearer to the village of Stondon (where the 2011 Census population was included).

Though a small settlement, Henlow Camp has a number of amenities which serve local residents and staff at the RAF base, as well as the wider area. Amenities include Derwent Lower School, a number of shops, a public house and bed and breakfast, a golf course, and a dog racing track.

References

Villages in Bedfordshire
Camp